The third siege of Krujë by the Ottoman Empire occurred in 1467 at Krujë in Albania.

The destruction of Ballaban Pasha's army and the siege of Elbasan during the previous siege of Krujë forced Mehmed II to re-attack Skanderbeg in the summer of 1467, only 2 months after the latter's victory at the 2nd siege of Krujë. This time Skanderbeg didn't retreat immediately to the mountains, but decided for the first time to confront the great Ottoman army at Burshek, on the Shkumbin River's valley in order to give time for the civil population to retreat into the mountains. Skanderbeg then retreated while Ottoman grand vizier Mahmud Pasha Angelović pursued him but Skanderbeg succeeded in fleeing to the coast and then to the mountains. Meanwhile, Mehmed II sent detachments to raid the Venetian possessions (especially Durrës which was also put under siege and bombarded for a short period) and to keep them isolated. He besieged Krujë for several days but when he realized that he could not take it by assault, he lifted the siege. Although Ottomans did not capture Krujë, they managed to plunder areas around Durres and Scutari.

See also
 First siege of Krujë
 Second siege of Krujë

References

Sources 
 

Warfare by Skanderbeg
Kruje
Kruje
Conflicts in 1467
Battles of Mehmed the Conqueror
1467 in the Ottoman Empire